Finian's Rainbow is a 1947 musical.

Finian's Rainbow may also refer to:

 Finian's Rainbow (unfinished film), an incomplete 1954 animated feature film
 Finian's Rainbow (1968 film), an Irish-American musical film
 Finian's Rainbow (album), a 1968  album by Stan Kenton
 Finian's Rainbow (horse), a British Thoroughbred racehorse